Willie "Tre" Herndon III (born March 5, 1996) is an American football cornerback for the Jacksonville Jaguars of the National Football League (NFL). He played college football at Vanderbilt.

Early years
Herndon attended East Hamilton High School in Ooltewah, Tennessee, a suburb of Chattanooga. A 3-star recruit, he committed to Vanderbilt University to play college football in 2013.

College career
Herndon played at Vanderbilt from 2014 to 2017. After his senior season in 2017, he entered the 2018 NFL Draft. During his career he had 122 tackles (2.5 for loss), two interceptions, 20 pass break-ups, and one forced fumble.

Professional career

On April 30, 2018, the Jacksonville Jaguars signed Herndon to a three-year, $1.71 million contract that includes $17,700 guaranteed and a signing bonus of $5,000.

Herndon entered training camp and competed for a roster spot as a backup cornerback against Dee Delaney, Dexter McDougle, Quenton Meeks, Jalen Myrick, and Sammy Seamster. Herndon earned the fifth and final cornerback spot on the roster after beating out Jalen Myrick. Head coach Doug Marrone named Herndon the fifth backup cornerback behind Jalen Ramsey, A. J. Bouye, D. J. Hayden, and Tyler Patmon.

After the Jaguars traded their starting cornerback Jalen Ramsey to the Los Angeles Rams in 2019, Herndon was promoted to starting corner. He had previously been starting while Ramsey had been out with a supposed back injury. In week 8 against the New York Jets, Herndon intercepted quarterback Sam Darnold twice in the 29-15 win.

In Week 9 of the 2020 season against the Houston Texans, Herndon recorded his first career sack on Deshaun Watson during the 27–25 loss. He was placed on the reserve/COVID-19 list by the team on December 16, 2020, and activated three days later.

Herndon signed a contract extension with the Jaguars on March 12, 2021.

On March 17, 2022, Herndon re-signed with the Jaguars.

On March 18, 2023, Herndon re-signed with the Jaguars.

Personal life
His parents, Willie Herndon, Jr. and Sabrina Herndon, work at Unum. He has a sister. He majored in Sociology. He was the first football player from East Hamilton High School to receive a scholarship from a Southeastern Conference school. Herndon is a practicing Muslim

References

External links
Jacksonville Jaguars bio
Vanderbilt Commodores bio

Living people
1996 births
African-American Muslims
Sportspeople from Chattanooga, Tennessee
Players of American football from Detroit
Players of American football from Tennessee
American football cornerbacks
Vanderbilt Commodores football players
Jacksonville Jaguars players
Ed Block Courage Award recipients